Stagecoach Hotel & Casino is a hotel and casino located in Beatty, Nevada, USA. It has  80 rooms, two restaurants, a casino with slot machines and table games, and a swimming pool. The Stagecoach is open 24 hours a day and is located on U.S. Route 95.

History
The Stagecoach opened in 1983.

References

External links
 Stagecoach casino

Buildings and structures in Nye County, Nevada
Casino hotels
Casinos completed in 1983
Casinos in Nevada
Hotel buildings completed in 1983
Hotels in Nevada
Tourist attractions in Nye County, Nevada
1983 establishments in Nevada